Phi Sigma Sigma, colloquially known as Phi Sig, was the first collegiate nonsectarian sorority to allow membership of women of all faiths and backgrounds.

The sorority was founded on November 26, 1913, and lists 60,000 initiated members, 115 collegiate chapters and more than 100 alumnae chapters, clubs and associations in the United States and Canada. Phi Sigma Sigma was founded to establish to the twin ideals of promoting the brotherhood of man and alleviation of the world's pain.

Since 1951, the sorority has been a member of the National Panhellenic Conference, the overarching organization of the 26 national sororities in the United States and Canada.

History
Phi Sigma Sigma was founded by ten women on November 26, 1913, at Hunter College, in Manhattan. The sorority's founders were: 
Lillian Gordon Alpern
Josephine Ellison Breakstone
Fay Chertkoff
Estelle Melnick Cole
Jeanette Lipka Furst
Ethel Gordon Kraus
Shirley Cohen Laufer
Claire Wunder McArdle
Rose Sher Seidman
Gwen Zaliels Snyder.

The original name for the sorority was Phi Sigma Omega, but they later learned this name was already in use by another organization. In 1918, Phi Sigma Sigma expanded by founding its Beta chapter at Tufts University in Medford, Massachusetts, and the Gamma chapter at New York University, although neither of those chapters are currently active. The sorority held its first national convention that year in New York City, where the constitution was adopted, and Fay Chertkoff, one of the founders, was elected Grand Archon.

The sorority first published its official publication, The Sphinx, in 1922.

Phi Sigma Sigma became an associate member of National Panhellenic Conference in 1947 and a full member in 1951.

In 1968, the separation of Hunter College's two campuses prompted the original Alpha chapter to divide. Alpha Alpha chapter was installed at the new Herbert Lehman College in the Bronx, while Alpha chapter remained on Hunter College's Park Avenue campus. Neither is still active.

In November 2009, the Delta chapter, at the State University of New York at Buffalo, was reinstalled; making it the oldest active chapter.  The second oldest active chapter is the Epsilon chapter at Adelphi University, in Garden City, New York, which was recolonized December 6, 2008. While other chapters were founded earlier and have been recolonized, the Xi chapter at Temple University is the oldest chapter in continuous existence, having been founded in 1926. The Upsilon chapter (1930) at the University of Manitoba was the first chapter established in Canada.

Symbols, Motto and Publications

The open motto is Diokete Hupsala (Aim High). The maxim is Once a Phi Sigma Sigma, always a Phi Sigma Sigma.

Phi Sigma Sigma's colors are king blue and gold. The official symbol is the Sphinx, while the official jewel is the sapphire. The American Beauty Rose is the official flower.

The original fraternity badge was a Sphinxhead with sapphire eyes on a gold base, bearing the Greek letters ΦΣΣ in blue enamel. Later, the fraternity developed a jeweled badge in the form of a gold pyramid with three sapphires in each corner, surmounted by the original Sphinxhead in the middle.

The pledge pin is a blue pyramid with a border of gold, on which is written Phi Sigma Sigma's motto.

The coat of arms is a Sphinxhead surmounting a ribbon bearing the Greek letters ΦΣΣ, set on a shield of seven bendlets of blue and white, the whole being superimposed on a pyramid with a rose at its apex and twin scrolls bearing the legend Diokete Hupsala and the year 1913 en plaque at the base below.

Phi Sigma Sigma's magazine is The Sphinx.  It publishes a biannual alumnae newsletter, The Rose.

The sorority's first song, "The Hymn," was written in 1921 by Pearl Lippman of the Alpha chapter and her husband, Arthur Lippman.

Philanthropy
To facilitate philanthropic activities, the Phi Sigma Sigma Foundation was created in 1969 by Jeanine Jacobs Goldberg, who was the foundation's first president. The Phi Sigma Sigma Foundation provides scholarships and educational grants, as well as leadership programming to collegiate and alumnae members. The National Kidney Foundation was Phi Sigma Sigma's primary philanthropic endeavor from 1971 until 2013. Since then, Phi Sigma Sigma has worked to educate people about kidney disease, as well as organ and tissue donation and transplantation. The Phi Sigma Sigma Foundation was a major sponsor of the National Kidney Foundation U.S. Transplant Games, a national Olympics-style event where organ-donor recipients competed in various athletic competitions.

Following the September 11 attacks, the Phi Sigma Sigma Foundation established the Twin Ideals Fund to provide assistance to disaster victims. Named for Phi Sigma Sigma's twin ideals to promote the brotherhood of man and alleviate the world's pain, the fund has contributed to aid organizations in the aftermath of the 2004 Indian Ocean earthquake and tsunami and Hurricane Katrina.

A three-year process began in 2011 to identify a new premier philanthropic partner. The first step was to define the organization's philanthropic focus. Through a member survey and focus groups, the committee settled on school/college readiness as its philanthropic focus. The next step was to create and disseminate an RFP (Request for Proposal) to philanthropic groups. Applications were submitted and the committee interviewed ideal candidates. The result was the adoption of two non-profits, Practice Makes Perfect and Kids in Need Foundation. Both aligned well with the Foundation's mission and the school/college readiness focus. It was decided by Practice Makes Perfect to become a for-profit organization in 2016. The Phi Sigma Sigma Foundation could no longer support Practice Makes Perfect according to regulations of a 501c3 organization. Phi Sigma Sigma is proud to grow its partnership with KINF and continues to support the efforts of KINF through its many backpack builds and work with local low income students and schools.

Membership

Chapters

Notable alumnae

See also
 List of Jewish fraternities and sororities
 List of social fraternities and sororities

References

External links
Phi Sigma Sigma Website
Phi Sigma Sigma Foundation

 
National Panhellenic Conference
Student societies in the United States
Student organizations established in 1913
1913 establishments in New York (state)
Historically Jewish sororities in the United States
Jewish organizations established in 1913